Churchmans Crossing station is a SEPTA Regional Rail station in Newark, Delaware. Located at 1 Fairplay Boulevard, it serves the Wilmington/Newark Line. The station lies on the property of the Delaware Park Racetrack, and has a 125-space parking lot. It is served by SEPTA on weekdays only. Churchmans Crossing station is referred to as Fairplay Station at Churchmans Crossing by DART First State.

Churchmans Crossing station consists of six plexiglass shelters within the parking lot. Access to the platform is available from a staircase leading down an embankment which runs parallel to the Delaware Park Boulevard bridge over the tracks. An elevator next to the staircase provides handicapped accessibility. The station was opened in 2000.

Station layout
Churchmans Crossing consists of a side platform adjacent to Track 1 that serves all SEPTA trains.

References

External links

SEPTA – Churchman's Crossing Station
 Station from Google Maps Street View
 Flickr Photos by DART First State

SEPTA Regional Rail stations
DART First State
Stations on the Northeast Corridor
Railway stations in Delaware
Transportation buildings and structures in New Castle County, Delaware
Railway stations in the United States opened in 2000
Wilmington/Newark Line